Ádám Bajorhegyi (born 17 November 1980 in Szeged) is a Hungarian handballer who plays for Eger-Eszterházy SzSE.

Achievements
Nemzeti Bajnokság I:
Silver Medalist: 2011
Nemzeti Bajnokság I/B:
Winner: 2006
Magyar Kupa:
Finalist:  2012

References

External links
 Ádám Bajorhegyi player profile on SC Pick Szeged official website
 Ádám Bajorhegyi career statistics at Worldhandball

1980 births
Sportspeople from Szeged
Living people
Hungarian male handball players
21st-century Hungarian people